The Ucayali River is the main headstream of the Amazon River. The city of Pucallpa is located on the banks of the Ucayali.

Description
Apurímac River (total length): 
Ene River (total length): 
Tambo River (total length): 
 Ucayali River (confluence with Tambo River to confluence with the Marañón):

Exploration
The Ucayali was first called San Miguel, then Ucayali, Ucayare, Poro, Apu-Poro, Cocama and Rio de Cuzco. Peru has organised many costly and ably-conducted expeditions to explore it.

Navigation
There are five difficult passes, due to the accumulation of trees and rafts of timber. Sometimes large rocks which have fallen from the mountains and spread over the river-bed cause whirlpools.

National Reserve
Ucayali is home to the Amazon river dolphin, giant otter, and the Amazonian manatee, which are abundant in Pacaya-Samiria National Reserve, close to Nauta. The southeastern border of the reserve is formed by the lower Ucayali River.

The river gives its name to the Ucayali Region of Peru and the Ucayali Province of the Loreto Region.

References

External links

Rivers of Peru
Tributaries of the Amazon River
Rivers
Rivers of Ucayali Region
Upper Amazon